Pseudbarydia is a genus of moths of the family Erebidae. The genus was erected by George Hampson in 1924.

Species
Pseudbarydia bicristata (Kaye, 1901) Trinidad
Pseudbarydia cladonia Felder, 1874
Pseudbarydia crespula (Möschler, 1880) Panama, Suriname, Peru
Pseudbarydia elipha Schaus, 1940
Pseudbarydia japeta (Stoll, [1781]) Suriname, Venezuela
Pseudbarydia pulverosa Schaus, 1911
Pseudbarydia schausi H. Druce, 1890
Pseudbarydia selene Möschler

References

Calpinae